The 1946 Belgian Grand Prix was a non-championship sportscar race held on 16 June 1946 in the public park of Bois de la Cambre in Brussels.

Report 
There were two supporting races. The 2000 cc (1000 cc s/c) race, officially called the Seaman Cup, was won by St John Horsfall driving an Aston Martin, with Leslie Johnson coming second in a Frazer Nash and earning the Winston Churchill Cup for the fastest lap. The 1100 cc race was won by Franco Bertani in a Stanguellini, ahead of Simca-Gordini co-founder Amédée Gordini in a car of his own construction, the latter having turned around whilst leading.

Entries

Classification

Footnotes

References 

Belgian Grand Prix
Belgian Grand Prix
Belgian Grand Prix 
Belgian Grand Prix